Terrence Christoffel Bieshaar (born 28 July 1997) is a Dutch professional basketball player for Feyenoord of the BNXT League.

Early career 
Bieshaar and his family moved to Sant Pere de Ribes in Spain, when he was nine years of age. In 2009, he joined the youth ranks of Spanish powerhouse FC Barcelona, before transferring to Joventut Badalona two years later.

Professional career
In the 2015–16 season, Bieshaar made his debut in senior basketball, when spending time on loan with Spanish LEB Oro side C.B. Prat Joventut and EBA club Queso Milner-Arenys Basquet Barcelona.

In the course of the 2016-17 campaign, he debuted for Joventut Badalona in Spain's elite league Liga ACB, while seeing considerable minutes for C.B. Prat Joventut in LEB Oro play. In August 2017, he signed with LEB Oro side CB Clavijo. After another stint at prat, Bieshaar joined Austrian first league side Oberwart Gunners in July 2020.

On February 14, 2022, he has signed with Feyenoord of the BNXT League.

International career 
Bieshaar represented the Netherlands at the 2013 under-16 European Championships (Division B) as well as at the 2015 under-18 (Division B) and 2016 under-20 (Division B) European Championships.

On 7 November 2017, Bieshaard was selected by coach Toon van Helfteren for the senior Netherlands national basketball team for the first time. On 23 February 2018, he made his national team debut against Italy.

Notes

External links 
 Profile at acb.com
 Profile at fiba.com

1997 births
Living people
CB Clavijo players
CB Prat players
Centers (basketball)
Dutch expatriate basketball people in Spain
Dutch men's basketball players
Feyenoord Basketball players
Joventut Badalona players
Liga ACB players
Sportspeople from Haarlem